This is a list of people executed in Romania. The list includes judicial executions carried out on the territory of present-day Romania, whether by that state or its antecedents.

Earlier jurisdictions
Kingdom of Hungary (1301–1526)
György Dózsa, peasant revolt leader, 1514
Principality of Transylvania (1570–1711)
Sándor Kendi, anti-Habsburg noble, 1594
Balthasar Báthory, anti-Habsburg noble, 1594
Farkas Kovacsóczy, anti-Habsburg noble, 1594
István Jósika, statesman, 1598
Starina Novak, prisoner of war, 1601
Habsburg monarchy
Horea and Cloșca, leaders of the Revolt of Horea, Cloșca and Crișan, 1785
Norbert Ormay, colonel in the 1848 revolution, 1849
The 13 Martyrs of Arad, generals in the 1848 revolution, 1849
Moldavia
Luca Arbore, diplomat, 1523
Bartolomeo Brutti, diplomat, 1592
Andronikos Kantakouzenos, statesman, 1601
Nichifor Beldiman, statesman, ca. 1616
Alexandru Coci, statesman, 1653
Vasile Gheuca and Gavril Costachi, statesmen, 1680
Manolache Bogdan and Ioniță Cuza, statesmen, 1778
Wallachia
Udrea Băleanu, statesman, 1600 or 1601
Leca of Cătun, statesman, 1616
Hrizea of Bogdănei, pretender, 1657
Istratie Leurdeanu, statesman, 1658
Diicul Buicescul, pretender, 1659
Constantin I Cantacuzino, statesman, 1663
Staico Bucșanu, statesman, ca. 1691
Ottoman Empire
Lupu Mehedințeanu, statesman, 1618
Constantine Hangerli, Prince of Wallachia, 1799
Hungarian State
Stephan Ludwig Roth, 1848 revolutionary, 1849
Ioan Buteanu, 1848 revolutionary, 1849
Austria-Hungary
Emil Rebreanu, military officer, 1917

Kingdom of Romania
Filimon Sârbu, communist activist and anti-fascist militant, 1941
Francisc Panet, communist activist, 1941
Pompiliu Ștefu, communist activist and anti-fascist militant, 1942
Nicolae Mohănescu, socialist activist and anti-fascist militant, 1942
Petre Gheorghe, communist activist and anti-fascist militant, 1943
Ion Antonescu, World War II-era dictator, 1946
Mihai Antonescu, foreign minister under Ion Antonescu, 1946
Gheorghe Alexianu, governor of Transnistria, 1946
, general and Gendermarie commander, 1946

Communist period
Nicolae Dabija, anti-communist resistance fighter, 1949
Remus Koffler, communist activist, 1954 
Lucrețiu Pătrășcanu, purged justice minister, 1954
Eugen Țurcanu, Pitești Prison figure, 1954
Iosif Capotă, anti-communist resistance fighter, 1958
Toma Arnăuțoiu, anti-communist resistance fighter, 1959
Oliviu Beldeanu, lead participant in the 1955 seizure of the Romanian embassy in Bern, 1960
Ioanid Gang, group of five bank robbers, 1962
Gheorghe Arsenescu, anti-communist resistance fighter, 1962
Ion Rîmaru, serial killer, 1971
Gheorghe Ștefănescu, businessman convicted of economic crimes, 1981
Ion Pistol, convicted murderer, 1987

Romanian Revolution
Nicolae Ceaușescu, dictator, 1989
Elena Ceaușescu, wife of Nicolae, 1989

See also
Capital punishment in Romania

Romania